The Piano Concerto is a concerto for solo piano and orchestra by the American composer Jennifer Higdon.  It was commissioned by the National Symphony Orchestra and was first performed December 3, 2009 at the John F. Kennedy Center for the Performing Arts in Washington, D.C.  The premiere featured pianist Yuja Wang and the National Symphony Orchestra under conductor Andrew Litton.

Composition
The Piano Concerto has a duration of roughly 30 minutes and is composed in three numbered movements.

Instrumentation
The work is scored for solo piano and an orchestra comprising two flutes (2nd doubling piccolo), two oboes, two clarinets, two bassoons, four horns, three trumpets, three trombones, tuba, harp, timpani, two percussionists, and strings.

Reception
Reviewing the world premiere, Anne Midgette of The Washington Post called it "a big, meaty, somewhat discursive concerto" and said, "the piece gave one so much to listen to that it flew by, and left one wanting to hear it again, which is no mean feat for a brand-new work."  Tim Smith of The Baltimore Sun wrote:
Mike Dunham of the Alaska Dispatch News was more critical of the piece, writing, "There's a lot of colorful instrumental combinations, but nothing sticks out — or sticks with the listener. For an often frantically busy piece consuming a half hour or more, there was no sense of transport or journey after the first movement."

See also
List of compositions by Jennifer Higdon

References

Concertos by Jennifer Higdon
2006 compositions
Higdon
Music commissioned by the National Symphony Orchestra